Death Wish 3 is a 1985 American action thriller film directed and edited by Michael Winner. It is the third film and the last to be directed by Winner in the Death Wish film series. It stars Charles Bronson as the vigilante killer Paul Kersey and sees him battling with New York street punk gangs while receiving tacit support from a local NYPD lieutenant (Ed Lauter). Despite being set in New York City, some of the filming was shot in London to reduce production costs. It was succeeded by Death Wish 4: The Crackdown.

Plot
Roughly one year after the events of the previous film, Paul Kersey has been traveling the country as a vigilante in various cities. He returns to New York City for the first time after having been banned for what he did five years ago to visit his Korean War buddy Charley, who is attacked by a gang in his East New York apartment. The neighbors hear the commotion and call the police. Paul arrives and Charley collapses dead in his arms. The police mistake Paul for the murderer and arrest him. At the police station, Police Chief Richard Shriker recognizes Paul as "Mr. Vigilante". Shriker lays down the law before Paul is taken to a holding cell. In the same cell is Manny Fraker, leader of the gang who killed Charley. After a fight between Paul and him, Manny is released. The police receive daily reports about the increased rate of crime. Shriker offers a deal to Paul: he can kill all the punks he wants, as long as he informs Shriker of any gang activity he hears about so the police can get a bust and make news. Paul moves into Charley's apartment in a gang-turf war zone. The building is populated by elderly tenants terrified of Manny's gang. They include Bennett Cross, a World War II veteran and Charley's buddy; Mr. and Mrs. Kaprov, an elderly Jewish couple; and a young Hispanic couple, Rodriguez and his wife Maria. After a few violent muggings, Paul buys a used car as bait. When two gang members try to break into the car, Paul shoots them with his Colt Cobra. Paul twice protects Maria from the gang, but is unable to save her a third time. She is assaulted and raped, later dying in hospital from her injuries.

Kersey orders a new gun, a Wildey hunting pistol. He spends the afternoon with Bennett handloading ammunition for it. He then tests the gun when the Giggler steals his Nikon camera. Paul is applauded by the neighborhood as Shriker and the police take the credit. Kersey also throws a gang member off a roof. Public defender Kathryn Davis is moving out of the city and Kersey offers to take her to dinner. While waiting in his car, Kathryn is knocked unconscious by Manny and the car is pushed downhill into oncoming traffic. It slams into another car and explodes, killing Kathryn. Shriker places Kersey under protective custody, fearing he is in too deep. After Bennett's taxi shop is blown up, he tries to get even, but his machine gun jams. The gang cripples Bennett. Kersey is taken by Shriker to the hospital, where he escapes after Bennett tells him where to find a second machine gun. Kersey and Rodriguez collect weapons. They proceed to mow down many of the criminals before running out of ammunition. Other neighbors begin fighting back as Manny sends in reinforcements. Shriker decides to help, and Kersey and he take down many of the gang together. Kersey goes back to the apartment to collect more ammunition, but Manny finds him there. Shriker arrives and shoots Manny, but not before getting wounded in the arm. As Kersey calls for an ambulance, Manny (who was secretly wearing a bulletproof vest) rises and turns his gun on the two men. As Shriker distracts him, Kersey uses a mail-ordered M72 LAW rocket launcher to obliterate Manny. The remainder of the gang rushes to the scene and sees Manny's smoldering remains. Surrounded by the angry crowds of neighbors, the gang realizes they've lost and flee the scene. As the neighbors cheer in celebration and with police sirens in the distance, Shriker gives Kersey a head start. Kersey gives a look of appreciation and takes off.

Cast

 Charles Bronson as  Paul Kersey
 Deborah Raffin as Kathryn Davis
 Ed Lauter as Police Chief Richard Shriker
 Martin Balsam as Bennett Cross
 Francis Drake as Charley
 Joe Gonzalez as Mr. Rodriguez
 Marina Sirtis as Maria Rodriguez
 Leo Kharibian as Eli Kaprov
 Hana Maria Pravda as Erica Kaprov
 John Gabriel as Emil
 Mildred Shay as Magda
 Gavan O'Herlihy as Manny Fraker
 Tony Spiridakis as Angel
 Alex Winter as Hermosa
 Nelson Fernandez as Chaco
 David Crean as Hector
 Tony Britts as Tulio
 Ricco Ross as "The Cuban"
 Kirk Taylor as "The Giggler"
 Barbie Wilde as Manny Fraker's Girlfriend
 Sandra Dee Richardson as Cuban Street Punk
 Margaret Mary Briggs as Hell's Angel Girl
 Manning Redwood as Captain Sterns
 Ron Hayes as Lieutenant
 Topo Grajeda as Garcia

Production

Development

Death Wish 3 was greenlit in June 1981 after the previous film earned back its budget before completing production when it signed a cable television distribution deal with HBO. Following the success of Death Wish II, Cannon Films proceeded in signing film contracts with prestigious actors and directors. Financially, their most reliable products were formulaic action films starring Charles Bronson, Chuck Norris, and other stars of the genre. The new sequel to Death Wish was announced at the 1984 Cannes Film Festival, with filming originally to begin in the autumn of 1984. Charles Bronson haggled with Cannon over his fee so they offered the role to Chuck Norris who turned it down claiming that the violence in the movie was "too negative". The concept of Paul Kersey facing a street gang which terrorizes elderly citizens was developed by screenwriter Don Jakoby. Jakoby specialized in science fiction films, having developed scripts for other upcoming films such as Lifeforce (1985) and Invaders from Mars (1986). His screenplay reportedly turned Kersey into an urban version of John Rambo, displeasing Bronson in the process. The producers then tasked Gail Morgan Hickman to write other potential versions of the script. Hickman came up with three different script samples and submitted them for approval. He learned weeks later that they were all rejected in favor of keeping Jakoby's version. The film had multiple deleted scenes that were planned to appear, but only some of them appeared in the TV cuts of the film. The only known ones were a meeting between Ed Lauter's character, Richard Shriker discussing the crime statistics with the District Attorney, the police confiscating a Doberman Pinscher that one of the residents had for protection against the gang and Paul Kersey using an old mattress as a punching bag as part of his workout routine. A scene that was never filmed included a male-on-male prison rape in its early scenes. It was removed by being too dark, but a similar scene was later included in another Bronson film, Kinjite: Forbidden Subjects (1989).  Don Jakoby objected to extensive rewrites of his script and asked for his name to be removed from the credits. The film used the pseudonym "Michael Edmonds" to credit its screenwriter. The film incorporated two elements of the Death Wish novel by Brian Garfield. The first was the concept of a giggling Puerto Rican thug; the second was the use of a car as bait for thieves. A scheduled novelization of the film was cancelled, since Garfield retained the exclusive right to write sequel novels. According to the book 'Bronson's Loose' by Paul Talbot, the original working title "Death Wish III" was changed to "Death Wish 3" because the Cannon Group conducted a survey and found that nearly half of the U.S. population could not read Roman numerals.

Casting

Bronson was paid $1.5 million out of the $10 million budget. Once again, director Michael Winner was recruited for the film project. His latest films, The Wicked Lady (1983) and Scream for Help (1984), were box office flops and Winner was in need of a "surefire hit". He decided against retaining the grim tone of the previous two Death Wish films, in favor of going gung-ho for the third film. Bronson said the film was "nearly the same as the first two Death Wishes that came before except this time he's not alone... It is a very violent picture but it all falls within the category of the story." Bronson did add however that "there are men on motorbikes, an element that's threatening – throwing bottles and that sort of thing – and I machine gun them. That to me is excessive violence and is unnecessary." The film includes a scene involving punks attempting to rape a topless woman. The role was played by Sandy Grizzle, the then-lover of the director. She would subsequently report of this relationship in the tabloids Daily Star and News of the World. She claimed that Winner whipped her and used her as a sex slave. Although Jimmy Page is credited as composer, he had no involvement with the movie. Michael Winner reused Page's score for Death Wish II in the editing stage, and rearranged the music for the actual soundtrack, which included Mike Moran (credited as "arranger and conductor") on synthesizers. When it came to the casting of muggers, the production crew hired multiple locals from London. Gavan O'Herlihy got the role as the main villain of the film, Manny Fraker. His character was originally supposed to be a Latino character named Alex Perez, so the character was no longer a Latino after he was hired. At the time, Alex Winter was a broke film student and needed a summer job, so he got the job as Hermosa in the film. Winter had also told that he and the other actors who play the members of the gang would do the stunts themselves, Alex Winter did the stunt where he falls off a moving car. After numerous failed takes, Michael Winner asked him jokingly, "I thought you wanted to do your own stunts?". Kirk Taylor who played "The Giggler" told a story that Winner didn't like Taylor's tardiness one day. However, Winner quickly dismissed that and called the popular director Stanley Kubrick who was in London to look for actors for his upcoming film, Full Metal Jacket (1987). Winner put a good word on Taylor and he got to play in the film. Paul Kersey's love interest in the film, Kathryn Davis was played by Deborah Raffin. She was good friends with his wife, Jill Ireland at the time and had spent time with her by horseback riding often. To prepare for her role as a public defender, she shadowed an actual Los Angeles one.

Filming

Filming started on April 19, 1985, in a "crime-infested" area of Brooklyn. Other New York locations used for the film included the Queensboro Bridge, the Port Authority Bus Terminal, and Long Island. In early May, the production team moved to London. Winner found it useful that both cities had a lot of Victorian buildings. The police station scenes were filmed at the old Lambeth Hospital in Lambeth, which has since been demolished. The neighborhood used for the gang war of the film was in Brixton, a district which was infested with real-life gangs. Cinematographer John Stanier was previously director of photography in Oxford Blues (1984) and The Dirty Dozen: Next Mission (1985). He would subsequently film Rambo III (1988). In his introduction to the Audible audio-book of "The Saint Intervenes", Brad Mengel states that the plot of Death Wish 3 is entirely based on "The Saint in New York", both by Leslie Charteris. Even though Death Wish 3 takes place in New York City, some parts of the film were shot in London to make the production less expensive. As a result, some of the extras (both police and gang members) were British. When filming was complete, Michael Winner solicited the help of U.S. Air Force military personnel stationed at High Wycombe Air Station in the UK to provide dubbing with their New York accents for the accents of the British extras. Of the British actors who appeared, Marina Sirtis had previously worked for Michael Winner on The Wicked Lady (1983). She followed her appearance in this film with landing the role of Deanna Troi on the TV show Star Trek: The Next Generation in 1987.

Reception

Box office
The film opened on November 1, 1985, on 1,460 screens and was number one at the U.S. box office for the weekend with a gross of $5,319,116. It was number one the following weekend too. The film earned $16.1 million in a seven-week run. Profits from foreign release, video, and television were sufficient to make this a lucrative release for Cannon films.

Critical response
After its release in theaters, Death Wish 3 received primarily negative reviews. Rotten Tomatoes reports an 11% approval rating based on 18 reviews, with a weighted average of 3.23/10. On Metacritic the film has a weighted average score of 18 out of 100, based on 9 critics, indicating "Overwhelming Dislike". Roger Ebert remarked that the film is a marginal improvement over Death Wish II with better action, directing, and special effects, but is still poor in absolute terms. He further commented that Bronson's acting showed his lack of enthusiasm for the film, and gave it one star. Variety also described Bronson's performance as lifeless, though they said the film's main flaw was its failure to provide a convincing motive for Paul Kersey's latest killing spree. Walter Goodman of The New York Times ridiculed the film's lack of realism, particularly that violent crime is surrealistically rampant, and that the repetition of the basic plot of the original Death Wish (i.e. that Kersey's closest friends and relatives are brutally murdered) grows more absurd with each installment of the series. He summarized that "There is not a moment of credibility in the movie and the ending is sheer chaos, and anticlimactic at that. Mr. Winner runs out of imagination before Mr. Bronson runs out of ammunition." However, he acknowledged that the film effectively created all the elements that make the Death Wish series appealing to its fans. Some lambasted the film for sadistic over-violent content and the fact that a 64-year-old Charles Bronson was thrown into a Rambo-like situation. Leonard Maltin said: "Same old stuff; Bronson's 'ordinary guy' character is no longer convincing, since his entire immediate family was wiped out by the end of Part 2.

In later years, it gathered a cult following, possibly due to its over-the-top nature, including lengthy action scenes (particularly the shoot 'em up finale), stylized violence, cheesy dialogue, and memorable one-liners. Its unreality has, in some film cult circles, been seen as "so bad it's hilariously good".

Other media

Video game
The film was made into a video game of the same name by Gremlin Graphics for the ZX Spectrum, Commodore 64, MSX and Amstrad CPC. In the game, the player controls Paul Kersey in the streets and buildings in a free-roaming, all-out gunfight with gangsters. It was one of the goriest games of its time, featuring multiple weapons with detailed, different damage patterns and the possibility to kill civilians. Because the original copyright owners of the game didn't have any interest in renewing copyright, the game fell into the "abandonware" and is considered public domain until proven otherwise.

References

External links
 
 
  
 

Death Wish (film series)
1985 films
1985 action thriller films
1980s vigilante films
American action thriller films
1980s English-language films
Fictional portrayals of the New York City Police Department
Films about the New York City Police Department
Films directed by Michael Winner
Films set in New York City
Films shot in London
Films shot in New York City
Golan-Globus films
Metro-Goldwyn-Mayer films
American sequel films
Films produced by Michael Winner
Films produced by Menahem Golan
Films produced by Yoram Globus
Films scored by Jimmy Page
1980s American films